Stephen John Lysak (August 7, 1912 – July 30, 2002) was an American sprint canoeist who competed in the late 1940s.

At the 1948 Summer Olympics in London, he won two medals with Stephen Macknowski. This included a gold in the C-2 10000 m and a silver in the C-2 1000 m events.

Born in Newark, New Jersey, Lysak designed and built the canoe he and Macknowski used for the 1948 Games. After the Olympics, Lysak resided in Yonkers, New York where he died in 2002.

References

 

1912 births
2002 deaths
American male canoeists
Canoeists at the 1948 Summer Olympics
Olympic gold medalists for the United States in canoeing
Sportspeople from Newark, New Jersey
People from Yonkers, New York
Olympic medalists in canoeing
Medalists at the 1948 Summer Olympics